Molla Bashi (also Romanized as Mollā Bāshī) is a village in Balghelu Rural District, in the Central District of Ardabil County, Ardabil Province, Iran. At the 2006 census, its population was 3,531, in 830 families.

References 

Towns and villages in Ardabil County